Sarmistha Sethi is an Indian politician. She was elected to the Lok Sabha, lower house of the Parliament of India from Jajpur, Odisha in the 2019 Indian general election as a member of the Biju Janata Dal.

References

External links
 Official biographical sketch in Parliament of India website

Living people
India MPs 2019–present
Lok Sabha members from Odisha
Biju Janata Dal politicians
Women in Odisha politics
1974 births
21st-century Indian women politicians